The SS-Führungshauptamt (SS-FHA) was the operational headquarters of the SS during the Nazi era. 

The office was responsible for the administration of the SS-Junker Schools, medical services, logistics, and rates of pay. It was also the administrative and operational headquarters for the Waffen-SS that was responsible for its organisation and equipment and order of battle of SS combat units.

Formation
The SS-Führungshauptamt, which was under the command of Heinrich Himmler, the head of the SS, was formed in August 1940 from certain departments of the SS Main Office (SS-Hauptamt or SS-HA) and the Allgemeine SS (General SS). Its main duty was the operational and administrative control of the Waffen-SS, including developing general policy on recruiting and handling special personnel requirements. It also oversaw the Kommandoamt der Allgemeine SS (General SS HQ). Hans Jüttner was promoted to the position of chief-of-staff of the SS-FHA and handled the day-to-day operations. When Himmler stepped down as SS-FHA chief in 1943, Jüttner took over as chief of the department till the end of the war.

Recruiting members for the Waffen-SS was handled through the SS Main Office and its chief, Gottlob Berger. This caused overlapping jurisdiction and friction between the two SS branches. Berger's command had a problematic relationship with the SS-FHA, which was responsible for organising, training and equipping the Waffen-SS. Jüttner's initial efforts at integrating the recruits from western Europe and Scandinavia were inadequate with insufficient emphasis on training and appointing officers and non-commissioned officers from the ranks of the new recruits. The SS-FHA also wanted the Waffen-SS to be a small elite corps, but Berger and Himmler knew that Adolf Hitler needed as many divisions as possible, even if that meant some Waffen-SS formations would be of lesser quality. During the war years, to meet the high casualty rates and expansion needs of the Waffen-SS, members of the Allgemeine SS and other personnel working for SS organisations were used for compulsory recruitment drives by the SS Main Office to meet the manpower needs of the Waffen-SS.

Organisation

Departmental Group A (Amtsgruppe A) 
Organisation, Personnel and Supply (Organisation, Personal, Versorgung)

 Amt I - Command Department of the Allgemeine SS (Kommandoamt der Allgemeinen-SS)  
 Amt II - Command Department of the Waffen-SS (Kommandoamt der Waffen-SS)
 Amt III - Central Chancellery (Zentralkanzlei)
 Amt IV - Administration Department (Verwaltungsamt)
 Amt V - Personnel Department (Personalamt)
 Amt VI - Office for (Horse) Rider and Driver Training (Reit- und Fahrwesen)
 Amt VII - Office for Logistics Planning (Nachschubwesen)
 Amt VIII - Weapons Department (Waffenamt)
 Amt IX - Department for Technical and Mechanical Development (Technische Ausrüstung und Maschinen)
 Amt X - Motor Vehicle Administration (Kraftfahrzeugwesen)  

Departmental Group B (Amtsgruppe B)
Training (Ausbildung)

 Amt XI - Officer Training (Führer-Ausbildung) and SS-Officer Cadet Schools (mit SS-Junkerschulen)   
 Amt XII - NCO Training (Unterführer-Ausbildung) and SS-NCO Training Schools (mit SS-Unterführerschulen)  

Departmental Group C (Amtsgruppe C)
Inspection (Inspektionen)
  
 Insp. 2   Infantry and Mountain Troops (Infanterie- und Gebirgstruppen)
 Insp. 3   Cavalry (Kavallerie)
 Insp. 4   Artillery (Artillerie)
 Insp. 5   Engineers / Technicians (Pioniere/Techniker)
 Insp. 6   Panzer troops (Panzertruppen)
 Insp. 7   Signals Troops (Nachrichtentruppen)
 Insp. 8   Field Maintenance Troops (Feldzeug- und Instandsetzungstruppen)
 Insp. 9   Service Support Troops (Versorgungstruppen)
 Insp. 10   Motor Pool Troops (Kraftfahrparktruppen)
 Insp. 11   Unknown 
 Insp. 12   Technical Training (Technische Lehrgänge)
 Insp. 13   Anti-Air Artillery (Flakartillerie)

Departmental Group D (Amtsgruppe D)
Medical Arm of the Waffen-SS (Sanitätswesen der Waffen-SS)

 Amt XIII - Administration (Verwaltung)
 Amt XIV - Dental (Zahnwesen)
 Amt XV - Supply (Versorgung)
 Amt XVI - Medical Treatment (Ärztliche Behandlung'')

References

Citations

Bibliography

 
 

FHA

de:SS-Hauptämter#SS-Führungshauptamt